190 Squadron may refer to:

 190 Squadron (Israel)
 No. 190 Squadron RAF, United Kingdom
 190th Fighter Squadron, United States